Ian Eric Oxnevad (born October 3, 1996) is an American professional baseball pitcher who is a free agent.

Amateur career
Oxnevad attended Shorewood High School in Shoreline, Washington. As a senior in 2015, he boasted an 11–0 record with a 0.53 ERA, giving up just six runs all season, helping lead Shorewood to the 3A state championship. Following the season, he was named The Herald's baseball player of the year. He committed to play college baseball at Oregon State University. After his senior season, he was selected by the St. Louis Cardinals in the eighth round of the 2015 Major League Baseball draft and signed for $500,000, forgoing his commitment to Oregon State.

Professional career
Oxnevad made his professional debut with the Rookie-level Gulf Coast League Cardinals, pitching to a 1–1 record with a 2.42 ERA in eight games (seven starts). Oxnevad spent 2016 with the Johnson City Cardinals of the Rookie-level Appalachian League, going 5–3 with a 3.38 ERA in 12 starts, and 2017 with the Peoria Chiefs of the Class A Midwest League, compiling a 3–10 record with a 4.09 ERA in 24 games (23 starts). In 2018, he pitched for the Palm Beach Cardinals of the Class A-Advanced Florida State League where he was 7–6 with a 4.79 ERA in 22 games (18 starts). He missed all of 2019 after undergoing surgery on his elbow.

Oxnevad did not play a minor league game in 2020 due to the cancellation of the minor league season caused by the COVID-19 pandemic. He missed all of the 2021 season due to injury. He elected free agency on November 9, 2021.

References

External links

Living people
1996 births
Baseball pitchers
Baseball players from Washington (state)
Minor league baseball players
Gulf Coast Cardinals players
Johnson City Cardinals players
Peoria Chiefs players
Palm Beach Cardinals players
Shorewood High School (Washington) alumni